Parque Martinelli de Carrasco is a private cemetery in Uruguay.

It is located at Canelones Department, near Colonia Nicolich, on the Ruta 102.

History
The cemetery was established in 1999; it is operated by Martinelli, a provider of funeral services.

Juan Maria Bordaberry Arocena (1928–2011), President of Uruguay from 1972 to 1976, is buried there.

References

External links
 How to get to Parque Martinelli de Carrasco
 

Cemeteries in Canelones Department
1999 establishments in Uruguay